Kotcho Lake is a lake in north-eastern British Columbia, Canada.

It is recognized as a Canadian Important Bird Area.

The Kotcho Lake Village Site Provincial Park is located on the southern shore of the lake.

The lake is located in muskeg tundra, in the Etsho Plateau, a region dominated by white spruce and black spruce. It is fed by the Kotcho River as well as several creeks. It is drained at the southern end by the Kotcho River, a tributary of the Hay River.

References

Lakes of British Columbia
Peace River Land District